was a Japanese film director who  specialized in directing Yakuza films. Yamashita was nicknamed Shōgun. His son is director Tomohiko Yamashita.

In 1952, He graduated from Kyoto University and joined Toei Film. He was working an office job, but three years later, he became an assistant director under Tomu Uchida and Kōzaburō Yoshimura.

Yamashita made his directorial debut with Wakatono Senryu Hada in 1961. His representative works included The Valiant Red Peony series and Kyōdai Jingi (1966).

Selected filmography

Film 
 Wakatono Senryu Hada (1961)
 Kyōdai Jingi (1966)
 The Vanity of the Shogun's Mistresses (1968)
 The Valiant Red Peony aka Hibotan Bakuto (1968)
 Zoro Me no San Kyōdai (1972)
 Yamaguchi-gumi Sandaime (1973)
 Yokosuka Naval Prison (1973)
 Yamaguchi-gumi gaiden: Kyushu Shinko-sakusen aka The Tattooed Hit Man
 Father of the Kamikaze (1974)
 Story of All-Out Attack or Path of Japanese Chivalry (1975)
 Jail Breakers aka Datsō Yugi (1976)
 Gōtō Satsujin Shu (1976)
 Tokugawa Ichizoku no Hōukai (1980)
 Shura no Mure (1984)
 The Last True Yakuza aka Saigo no Bakuto (1985)
 Night Train (1987)
 The Man Who Assassinated Ryoma (1987)
 Another Way (1988)
 Yakuza Ladies: The Final Battle (1990)
 Shin Gokudō no Tsumatachi Kakugoshiiya (1993)

Television
 Oshizamurai Kiichihōgan (1974) (ep.13)
 Hissatsu Shigotonin (1980) (ep.8)
 Choshichiro Edo Nikki (1983-91)
 Nemuri Kyōshirō Burai Hikae (1983)
 Katsu Kaishu (1990) (TV Film)
 Abare Hasshū Goyō Tabi (1991-94)

Further reading
Shōgun to Yobareta Otoko Eiga Kantoku Yamashita Kōsaku 将軍と呼ばれた男―映画監督山下耕作 (ワイズ出版 1999)

References

External links
Kōsaku Yamashita profile and Films at Kinenote

Japanese film directors
1930 births
1998 deaths
Yakuza film directors